Curculigosides are phenols that have been isolated from a variety of plant sources.  Curculigoside A, B, C and D can be found in Curculigo orchioides. Curculigoside B can be isolated by high-speed counter-current chromatography.  Curculigosides B and D have in vitro activity against β-amyloid aggregation.

References

Phenol glycosides
Curculigo
Phenol ethers